Euchontha is a genus of moths of the family Notodontidae. It consists of the following species:
Euchontha anomala  (Prout, 1918) 
Euchontha carboniptera Miller, 2008
Euchontha castrona Warren, 1906
Euchontha ciris Druce, 1893
Euchontha commixta Warren, 1904
Euchontha frigida  (Walker, 1864) 
Euchontha memor Warren, 1904
Euchontha moyobamba Miller, 1989

Notodontidae of South America